Abdelwahab Benmansour (born 1920, Fes – died 13 November 2008, Rabat) was a Moroccan historian and civil servant. His most important work is "The tribes of Morocco", a historical study of Moroccan tribes and their origins. He also edited some previously unpublished works such as a 15th-century detailed manuscript about the history of Ceuta as well as works by al-Baydhaq and Ibn Tumart, the eminent Imam and spiritual leader of the Almohads.

Abdelwahab Benmasour was the official histographer of the Kingdom of Morocco working under Mohammed V, Hassan II and Mohammed VI.

References

See also
Évariste Lévi-Provençal
Abdallah Laroui
Emilio García Gómez
Abdelhadi Tazi

20th-century Moroccan historians
Moroccan civil servants
People from Fez, Morocco
Moroccan scholars
Moroccan educators
1920 births
2008 deaths